Raorchestes kaikatti, sometimes known as the Kaikatti bushfrog or Kaikatt's bush frog, is a critically endangered frogs found only in the Nelliampathi Hills within the Western Ghats of Kerala, India. The species is named after Kaikatti, its type locality.

Raorchestes kaikatti are small (but medium-sized in Raorchestes terms), relatively robust-bodied frogs. Males measure  in snout–vent length (the type series did not include any females). The dorsum is dark greyish brown with irregular light-grey and dark-brown blotches. There is a dark horizontal grey band in between the eyes.

References

External links
 

kaikatti
Endemic fauna of the Western Ghats
Frogs of India
Amphibians described in 2009
Taxa named by Sathyabhama Das Biju